Ruby red is a color

The term may also refer to
RAL 3003 Ruby red, a RAL color
Ruby Red (album), a 2013 album by The Love Language
"Ruby Red" (song), by Slade
Ruby Red, the first book of the Ruby Red Trilogy by Kerstin Gier
 Ruby Red (film) the 2013 film based on the first book of the Ruby Red Trilogy
Ruby Red grapefruit
North Devon cattle